Sasaram Junction railway station is on the Gaya–Mughalsarai section of the Grand Chord line in India. It serves Sasaram and the surrounding areas in Rohtas district in the Indian state of Bihar. Sasaram is well connected to Delhi and Kolkata. It is also connected to Patna via Ara railway station.

This place was also known for preparation of competitive exams at Sasaram Railway junction. According to earlier natives of this city, there was not proper electrification of city around 2007–2008 which hampered the studies of students seeking for competitive exams. Still Indian Railways had 24 hours power supply at Sasaram Junction. This led a small group of students to study there at night under electric lights.

However, the authorities have now banned study groups citing safety concerns.

See also
Ara–Sasaram DEMU

References

Railway stations in Rohtas district
Mughalsarai railway division